Československá obchodní banka, a.s. (ČSOB) is one of the largest commercial banks operating in the Czech Republic. It is a universal bank that offers a full range of banking services to individuals and companies. It operates 280 ČSOB branded branches, and 3,300  Česká pošta (Czech postal company) branches under the brand name Poštovní spořitelna.

The bank is owned by Belgium-based KBC Bank. Until 2008 ČSOB also operated in Slovakia, but in 2008 a new company Československá obchodná banka, a.s. (ČSOB Slovakia) was created under direct control of KBC Bank. Czech ČSOB holds a 47% minority stake in Slovak ČSOB. Since 2011, the bank has sponsored the Czech ice hockey club HC Pardubice, which took the name HC ČSOB Pojišťovna Pardubice.

History

ČSOB was established in 1964 in the former Czechoslovakia as the sole bank providing foreign trade, financing and convertible currency operations. After 1989, ČSOB expanded its activity to include services for entrepreneurs and for individuals.

A major milestone in ČSOB's history was its privatisation in June 1999, when the Belgian KBC Bank (a member of the KBC Group NV) bought a 66% majority stake from the Czech government for 40 billion CZK. Later, in 1999, KBC bought a further 16.63% stake from the National Bank of Slovakia. At the same time the European Bank for Reconstruction and Development purchased 7.47% from the NBS.

Prior to acquiring its bankrupt competitor Investiční a poštovní banka in 1999, ČSOB was the fourth-largest bank in the Czech Republic. The acquisition of Investiční a poštovní banka, at the time the third-largest Czech bank, brought an additional 3.3 million customers and a network of 179 branches.

Since 1 July 2008 ČSOB Slovakia has begun to merge with Istrobanka following the latter's acquisition by KBC.

In November 2009, KBC announced a plan to float 40% of ČSOB on the Prague Stock Exchange the following year.

ČSOB Group 

ČSOB Group is one of the largest financial institutions in the Czech Republic. From 1 January 2013 KBC Group's core market activities have been arranged in three business units: Belgium, the Czech Republic and International Markets.

Financial data

Headquarters 
 Československá obchodní banka, a.s., Radlická 333/150, 150 57 Prague, Czech Republic
 Československá obchodná banka, a.s., Michalská 18, 815 63 Bratislava, Slovakia

References

External links 

 ČSOB official site in the Czech Republic
 ČSOB official site in Slovakia
 ČSOB Pojišťovna (insurance company), official site in the Czech Republic
 ČSOB Pojišťovna, car insurance

Banks of the Czech Republic
Banks of Slovakia
Companies of Czechoslovakia
Banks established in 1964